Fantasy is the 15th studio album by Filipino singer Regine Velasquez-Alcasid. The album was released on November 21, 2010 by Universal Records, which was her second full-length studio album under Universal after Low Key in 2008. The two-disc album contains both pop and mid-tempo sounds, as well as some softer and more contemporary melodies. The first disc contains new Original Pilipino Music (OPM) materials while the second disc contains cover songs from various artists. This two-disc album also consists of two packaging editions, the "colored one" and the "black & white edition", with each containing collector's item photo cards and the CDs. The photos used were taken by photographer Mark Nicdao. The album debuted at number one spot and was certified Gold Award after two weeks upon released. Fantasy was nominated at the 24th Philippine Awit Awards for Album of the Year and Best Performance by a Female Recording Artist for the song You Don't Know.

Background
For this album, Velasquez pointed that she would like to work with young composers and assemble it with entirely new OPM materials than covering songs which done from her previous albums, Covers, Vol. 1, Covers, Vol. 2 and Low Key. And throughout the project, she worked with her now husband singer-songwriter Ogie Alcasid, with whom she had collaborated most of her hit songs from her previous albums. Though the second disc of the album contains mostly cover songs talking about being in love and marriage, the songs were mainly chosen by Velasquez herself going through her own wedding preparations at that time with Alcasid. The album also includes a song called S.M.I.L.E. written by Noel Mendez that became the theme song for Operation Smile after Velasquez became one of the ambassador to the foundation together with the main theme song of TV musical series Diva called Walang Iba and the love theme of TV romantic comedy series I ♥ You Pare! penned by Janno Gibbs called True Romance, both which Velasquez starred aired over GMA-7.

Awards and Accolades

Track listing

See also
 Regine Velasquez discography

References

Regine Velasquez albums
2010 albums